OMG, I'm a Robot?! (Hebrew: אני לא מאמין, אני רובוט?!, tr.

Actors Yotam Ishay and Tzahi Grad co-star in the lead roles. It also presents a Jewish "R2-D2" dubbed by Rob Schneider. It was produced by Amir Manor, shot by Tomer Shani and edited by Yiftach Paul Shoshan.

Premise
Danny is amazed to find out he is a deadly robot. With renewed hopes and robotic forces, and with the help of his macho boss and a small Jewish "R2D2" (Dubbed by Rob Schneider), Danny sets off to rescue the love of his life.

Cast
  as Danny Bernstein	
  as Goldschmidt, Danny's boss		
  as Noa, Danny's girlfriend  	
  as Dimitry 		
 Inna Bakelman as Maya		
 Rob Schneider as Robo Joseph (voice only)		
 Nelly Tagar as Netta		
  as Moyshe'le	
 Ori Yaniv as Yossi (a bully)
 Yossi Marshek as Herzl (a bully)		
 Guy Gior as Hot guy in the Park with a dog		
 Lior Duvdevani as Policeman No. 1		
 Ilan Kovach as Policeman No. 2

Release
The film was screened at all major Israeli cinemas.

The film had his international premiere on 14 October 2016 at the Sitges Film Festival in Catalonia, Spain, and was selected as an official nominee in the festival's "Midnight Extreme" competition. In 2017 the film screened in several genre film festivals, including Italy's Fantafestival, Portugal's Fantasporto, Brazil's Fantaspoa, Boston Science Fiction Film Festival and was selected to be the opening film of the Other Worlds Austin SciFi Film Festival.

The film is available for home entertainment on Israeli video on demand.

Reception
The film was nominated by the Sitges Film Festival for "Best Feature" award at the "Midnight Extreme" competition.

The film was also nominated for an Ophir Award by the Israeli Academy of Film and Television members for "Best Art Design".

It was awarded "Best Feature Film Editing" at the Other Worlds Austin SciFi Film Festival in Austin, Texas.

References

Reviews

  
 
 
OC Movie review, The Robots Are Coming, from Israel. 26 November 2019

External links
 
 
 OMG, I’M A ROBOT on HBO Special
 OMG, I’M A ROBOT on I24

2015 fantasy films
2010s science fiction comedy films
2010s superhero films
2015 films
2010s Hebrew-language films
2015 independent films
Israeli independent films
Israeli science fiction comedy films
Robot films
2015 comedy films